The Peugeot Type 24 is an early motor vehicle produced between 1898 and 1901 by the French auto-maker Peugeot at their Audincourt plant. Twenty were produced.

The vehicle was powered by a rear-mounted four stroke engine, manufactured by Peugeot themselves. The engine's two cylinders were mounted in parallel and not in the V-format used for the company's first petrol engined vehicle. The engine was mounted behind the driver and his (or, at least in principle, her) passenger above the rear axle.

A similar but longer vehicle with space for four, the Peugeot Type 21, was introduced in the same year. Two years later, in 1900, the company introduced the Peugeot Type 31 which was a variation on the same theme, but a little shorter than the Type 24.

Sources and further reading 
 Wolfgang Schmarbeck: Alle Peugeot Automobile 1890-1990. Motorbuch-Verlag. Stuttgart 1990. 

1890s cars
1900s cars
Type 24
Vehicles introduced in 1898
Cars introduced in 1898
Rear-engined vehicles

it:Peugeot Type 21, 24, 30 e 31